Space War is a video game cartridge released by Atari, Inc. in 1978 for the Atari Video Computer System (renamed to the Atari 2600 in 1982). The game is a version of Spacewar!, the 1962 computer game by Steve Russell.  It was released by Sears as Space Combat, for its Atari compatible Tele-Games system. An Atari Lynx update was planned but never released.

Variations
The cartridge includes 17 game variations. Variations 1–13 are duels between two ships and 14 to 17 are for one player. In some of the variations the ships fight near a planet which has gravitational attraction.

References

External links
Space War at Atari Mania

1978 video games
Atari 2600 games
Cancelled Atari Lynx games
North America-exclusive video games
Multidirectional shooters
Video games developed in the United States
Video game remakes
Science fiction video games